The 1972 Ottawa Rough Riders finished the season in 2nd place in the Eastern Conference with an 11–3 record, with all three losses coming at the hands of the 1st place Hamilton Tiger-Cats. The team lost in the Eastern Finals series to those same Tiger-Cats by a total points score of 30–27.

Preseason

Regular season

Standings

Schedule

Postseason

Player stats

Passing

Awards and honors
 CFL's Coach of the Year – Jack Gotta
 Jerry Campbell, Linebacker, CFL All-Star
 Wayne Smith, Defensive End, CFL All-Star

References

Ottawa Rough Riders seasons
1972 Canadian Football League season by team